Vicious may refer to:

Music
 Johnny Vicious, American house DJ, producer and remixer
 Sid Vicious (1957–1979), punk rock musician
 Vicious (rapper), Jamaican-American rapper and reggae artist active in the 1990s
 Vicious (Nasty Idols album), 1993
 Vicious (Halestorm album), 2018
 "Vicious" (Lou Reed song), 1973
 "Vicious", a song by Parkway Drive on the album Ire
 "Vicious", a song by Chantal Kreviazuk on the album Hard Sail
 "Vicious" (Tate McRae song), 2020
  "Vicious" (Sabrina Carpenter song), 2022
 Vicious Vinyl, an Australian record label

Other uses
Vicious, meaning "full of vice"
To Make a Killing, a 1988 Australian film also known as Vicious
 Vicious (Cowboy Bebop), a Cowboy Bebop character
 Vicious (TV series), a British television sitcom
 Vicious (novel), a 2013 novel by V. E. Schwab
 Sid Vicious, stage name for professional wrestler Sid Eudy
 "Vicious" Verne Seibert, a professional wrestler from NWA All-Star Wrestling
 Vivian Harris (nickname "Vicious", born 1978), Guyanese professional boxer

See also
 Vicious and Delicious, professional wrestling tag team
 Vicious Circle (disambiguation)